Kochanów  (German Erdmannsweiler) is a village in the administrative district of Gmina Głuchów, within Skierniewice County, Łódź Voivodeship, in central Poland.

References

Villages in Skierniewice County